Patmawati Abdul Hamid (born 18 February 1972 in Makassar), also written as Patmawati Abdul Wahid, is an Indonesian female former weightlifter who competed in the 58 kg category and represented Indonesia at international competitions. 

She competed at the 2004 Summer Olympics and at the 2003 World Weightlifting Championships.

Major results

References

External links
 
 
 
 
 
 

1972 births
Living people
Indonesian female weightlifters
Weightlifters at the 2004 Summer Olympics
Olympic weightlifters of Indonesia
Sportspeople from Makassar
Weightlifters at the 1990 Asian Games
Weightlifters at the 1994 Asian Games
Asian Games medalists in weightlifting
Asian Games silver medalists for Indonesia
Asian Games bronze medalists for Indonesia
World Weightlifting Championships medalists
Medalists at the 1990 Asian Games
Medalists at the 1994 Asian Games
Southeast Asian Games silver medalists for Indonesia
Southeast Asian Games medalists in weightlifting
Competitors at the 2003 Southeast Asian Games
20th-century Indonesian women
21st-century Indonesian women